Miyan Deh (also Romanized as Mīyān Deh, Meyān Deh, and Mīān Deh; also known as Eslāmābād) is a village in Miyan Deh Rural District, Shibkaveh District, Fasa County, Fars Province, Iran. At the 2006 census, its population was 5,524, in 1,268 families.

References 

Populated places in Fasa County